David García Haro (born 3 February 1980) is a Spanish retired footballer who played as a defender.

Club career
Born in Valencia, Valencian Community, Garcia signed for FC Barcelona at the age of 16 from local Levante UD, playing his first four senior seasons with the B-side in the third division and helping them to two top-two league finishes, with the reserves subsequently falling short in the promotion playoffs. He never appeared officially for the Catalans' first team, his only appearance being the second half of a friendly match with China on 22 April 2004, coming on as a substitute for Marc Overmars.

In the summer of 2004, García moved to Barça neighbours Gimnàstic de Tarragona, contributing to 28 league games in his second season as the club returned to La Liga after a 56-year absence. On 10 December 2006, he scored his only goal in the top division in a 2–1 home win against Levante, but Nàstic was immediately relegated back.

After one year with Cádiz CF, playing sparingly in another first division promotion, García resumed his career in the lower leagues.

References

External links

Stats and bio at Cadistas1910 

1980 births
Living people
Footballers from Valencia (city)
Spanish footballers
Association football defenders
La Liga players
Segunda División players
Segunda División B players
Tercera División players
FC Barcelona C players
FC Barcelona Atlètic players
Gimnàstic de Tarragona footballers
Cádiz CF players
Terrassa FC footballers
UE Vilassar de Mar players
Spain youth international footballers